"Mary Had a Little Lamb" is a song written by Paul and Linda McCartney and released as a non-album single by the British–American rock band Wings in March 1972. It is based on the traditional nursery rhyme of the same name.

Background
At the time, some observers such as Roy Carr and Tony Tyler of New Musical Express presumed the song was recorded by McCartney in response to the BBC ban of his previous single, the political "Give Ireland Back to the Irish", but McCartney has denied this, saying that it was a sincere effort to write a song for children. In fact, the song was written before "Give Ireland Back to the Irish", as a demo of the song can be heard during an interview recorded for radio station WRKO in December 1971. For the front and rear cover and the labels, two illustrations by Clara Miller Burd were used.

Charts and reception
"Mary Had a Little Lamb" was released as a single on 12 May 1972 in the UK, moved back from its original planned date of the 5th. The record was released in the US on 29 May. On 25 May, the band mimed a performance of the song for BBC TV's Top of the Pops TV show.

The song was attacked by several contemporary rock critics, with one commenting that McCartney had "fallen to tripe" of this genre. However, some critics suspected this immediate change in musical direction to be a deliberately ironic musical manoeuvre.  Cash Box said of it that "the nursery rhyme we all know and love gets a bouncy treatment."  It reached the top 10 in the UK, peaking at number nine. Some US radio stations also played the pop/rock B-side, "Little Woman Love".  Apple Records in the US even revised the picture sleeve for the single to credit both sides by name (see reverse cover), but the single still failed to rise above number 28 in the US.

It was also included on The 7" Singles Box in 2022.

Charts

References

Paul McCartney songs
1972 singles
Apple Records singles
Paul McCartney and Wings songs
Songs written by Paul McCartney
Songs written by Linda McCartney
Song recordings produced by Paul McCartney
Music published by MPL Music Publishing
Songs based on children's songs
Songs about shepherds
Songs about sheep